Rua Libertadores de África (Portuguese for "street of the Liberators of Africa") is one of the main streets in the city centre of Mindelo, Cape Verde It was formerly called Rua Lisboa ("Lisbon street"). It runs from the seaside Avenida Marginal to the Palácio do Povo (the former Government Palace).

Notable buildings along the street:
Palácio do Povo, built in 1874, expanded in 1928-34
Municipal market, built in 1878
French consulate and Alliance Française, built in 1858 
the former Customs House, now the Cultural Centre of Mindelo, built 1858-1860

References

Mindelo
Transport in São Vicente, Cape Verde